Agave × leopoldii is a hybrid species of flowering plant in the family Asparagaceae. It is the result of a cross between Agave filifera and Agave schidigera, conducted in the 1870s by W.B. Kellock in Stamford Hill, London, and does not strongly resemble either parent. It has gained the Royal Horticultural Society's Award of Garden Merit as an ornamental.

References

leopoldii
Interspecific plant hybrids
Endemic flora of Mexico
Flora of Northeastern Mexico
Plants described in 1893